The Premier League is the premier futsal league in Armenia. It was founded in 1998. The Premier League, which is played under UEFA rules and is organized by the Football Federation of Armenia, currently consists of 5 teams.

2017-18 teams
Currently, 8 teams are participating in the 2017-18 season:

Champions

See also
 Armenia national futsal team
 Sport in Armenia

References

External links
Football Federation of Armenia
Futsalplanet 

Futsal competitions in Armenia
Armenia 
Futsal
1998 establishments in Armenia
Sports leagues established in 1998